Rit'ipata (Quechua rit'i snow, pata elevated place / above, at the top / edge, bank (of a river), shore, also spelled Ritipata) is a mountain in the Andes of Peru, about  high. It is situated in the Ayacucho Region, Cangallo Province, Paras District. Rit'ipata lies south-west of the mountain Saywa Q'asa and north of the mountain Waranwallqa.

References

Mountains of Peru
Mountains of Ayacucho Region